McBeath is a surname. Notable people with the surname include:

Arthur McBeath (1876–1945), Australian cricketer
Dan McBeath (1897–1963), New Zealand cricketer
Darin McBeath (born 1976), Canadian alpine skier
George McBeath (died 1812), Canadian fur trader
Malcolm McBeath (1880–1957), Canadian mayor
Michael McBeath (born 1950), Zimbabwean cyclist
Robert McBeath (1898–1922), Scottish recipient of the Victoria Cross in World War I
Tom McBeath, Canadian actor
William McBeath (1856–1917), Scottish footballer